The 2021 season was the club's fourth straight campaign in the Eliteserien since their promotion in 2017. Bodø/Glimt entered the campaign as league champions, winning their first ever Norwegian title in 2020. The start of the season was postponed from 5 April to 8 May due to the COVID-19 pandemic, where Glimt first played their local rivals Tromsø on 9 May 2021.

On 12 December 2021, Bodø/Glimt retained their title as Eliteserien champions with a 3–0 win over Mjøndalen in the final match of the league season.

Current squad 

 
 

 
 
 

  

 

 

For season transfers, see transfers winter 2020–21 and transfers summer 2021.

Out on loan

Competitions

Pre-season & friendlies

Eliteserien

League table

Matches

Norwegian Cup

UEFA Champions League

First qualifying round

UEFA Europa Conference League

Second qualifying round

Third qualifying round

Play-off round

Group stage

The draw for the group stage was held on 27 August 2021.

Knockout phase

Knockout round play-offs

Round of 16

Squad statistics

Appearances and goals

|-
|colspan="14"|Players away from Bodø/Glimt on loan:

|-
|colspan="14"|Players who appeared for Bodø/Glimt no longer at the club:

|}

Goalscorers

Disciplinary record

Transfers

References 

2. *soccerway
3. *betexplorer
4. *worldfootball

External links 
 Official web site for Bodø/Glimt
 Glimtforum.Net – Discussion forums

FK Bodø/Glimt seasons
Bodø/Glimt
Norwegian football championship-winning seasons